The BRD Arad Challenger is a tennis tournament held in Arad, Romania since 2010. After a successful first edition in 2012, the tournament was not held in 2011 due to lack of sponsors. In early 2012 it was announced that BRD – Groupe Société Générale will sponsor the tournament and thus will rename it to BRD Arad Challenger. The event is part of the ATP Challenger Tour and is played on outdoor clay courts.

Past finals

Singles

Doubles

References

External links
Romanian Tennis Federation

 
ATP Challenger Tour
Tennis tournaments in Romania
Clay court tennis tournaments